Draped Up & Chipped Out, Vol. 4 is the seventh compilation album by American rapper Messy Marv. The album is the 4th and final album of his Draped Up & Chipped Out series. Although it never matched the success of the series' third volume, it did peak at #79 on the R&B/Hip-Hop Albums chart, #33 on the Heatseekers Albums chart, #1 on the Top Heatseekers West North Central chart, and #5 on the Top Heatseekers Pacific chart. It includes guest appearances from Tech N9ne, Keak da Sneak, Young Doe, Krizz Kaliko, The Jacka, Dru Down & Big Scoob, among others.

Track listing

References

2009 albums
Messy Marv albums
Sequel albums